The 2021 Slovak Open II was a professional tennis tournament played on hard courts. It was the 23rd edition of the tournament which was part of the 2021 ATP Challenger Tour. It took place in Bratislava, Slovakia between 8 and 14 November 2021.

Singles main-draw entrants

Seeds

 1 Rankings are as of 1 November 2021.

Other entrants
The following players received wildcards into the singles main draw:
  Jonáš Forejtek
  Lukáš Palovič
  Lukáš Pokorný

The following player received entry into the singles main draw as an alternate:
  Tobias Kamke

The following players received entry from the qualifying draw:
  Danylo Kalenichenko
  Miloš Karol
  Zsombor Piros
  Dalibor Svrčina

The following players received entry as lucky losers:
  Shintaro Mochizuki
  Alexander Shevchenko

Champions

Singles

  Tallon Griekspoor def.  Zsombor Piros 6–3, 6–2.

Doubles

  Filip Horanský /  Sergiy Stakhovsky def.  Denys Molchanov /  Aleksandr Nedovyesov 6–4, 6–4.

References

2021 ATP Challenger Tour
2021
2021 in Slovak tennis
November 2021 sports events in Europe